David O'Hare and Joe Salisbury were the defending champions but lost in the quarterfinals to Dominik Köpfer and Alex Lawson.

Austin Krajicek and Tennys Sandgren won the title after defeating Luke Bambridge and Liam Broady 7–6(7–4), 7–6(7–2) in the final.

Seeds

Draw

References
 Main Draw
 Qualifying Draw

JSM Challenger of Champaign-Urbana - Doubles